Johnston Heights Secondary is a public high school in Surrey, British Columbia and is part of School District 36 Surrey.

The newest building was built in 1989. Johnston Heights' exterior highly resembles that of its neighbouring high school, North Surrey Secondary School. The Canadian government chose to highlight the school for its program to improve intercultural understanding. Yearly, Johnston Heights' REACH Council has been working to support Multicultural Week, Health Week, World Causes Week and annual holiday celebrations are also held. In 2007-2008, Johnston Heights initially set out to raise $2000.00 for the KIVA organization (kiva.org) and eventually raised over $2,500.00 to provide micro loans to people in the third-world for their businesses.

Sport
Johnston Heights has also been involved in sports, attending yearly track meets and involving students in lunch time sports events held inside the Eagle Dome (the school gym). Sports at Johnston Heights include Cross Country, Volleyball, Basketball, Soccer, Badminton, Track and Field, Golf, Hockey, Tennis, Cricket, football, and Girls Rugby. Many students have taken leadership roles to promote healthy lifestyle and daily physical activity.

Extra-curricular activities
Many clubs at Johnston Heights include their  Debate Team, Eagle Council, JH Media Crew, Theatre Company, Model United Nations, Wellness club, JH Newspaper Committee, Business Club, Leadership team and more. The Johnston Heights Leadership Team (JHLT) is known for there avid participation in activities outside of the school campus. JHLT have helped coordinate many Runvan events, including the BMO marathon, which occurred on May 1, 2022.

Academic information
Academically, Johnston Heights has promoted school Math Contests, School Speech Meets and has sent students to Provincial Debate Meets in Victoria, Prince George and Vancouver. The school is also in involved in science fairs, musical and theatrical productions and home to Canadian Artist, Math, Music, Science contest winners. The Johnston Heights choir as also been involved with the Whistler Choir festival and placed as a top choir. Johnston Heights offers French, Spanish and language challenge courses for senior students. Programs like ESL (English as a Second Language) and B.A.S.E.S incorporated into the school. The school has a strong academic range, with more than 50% of the school's students on the honour roll. At every end of the year the schools host an awards ceremony called the Gala Awards to celebrate the success of many students and presenting them with awards ranging from math awards (Gauss, Pascal, Fermat etc.) to top academic students per grade. The school has also been a key school in Surrey for hosting the Integrated Studies program in the school from students who would like to take Social Studies and English as one course for the year which is beneficial to letting students have a better chance to explore their learning. The school also offers courses such as Peer-Tutoring, Jewelry Making, Info-Tech, Law, Math Honours, Home Economics: Textiles, Theatre Stage Production and the very popular Home Economics: Foods.

It is notable that Johnston Heights is an IB MYP school. It, along with Semiahmoo Secondary School are the only certified International Baccalaureate secondary schools within Surrey. The school was certified on 28 March, 2017.

Notable alumni 
Sydney Leroux, US Women's National Soccer Team player
Brandon Jay McLaren, actor
Christabel Nettey, Canadian Olympic Long Jumper
Dr. Lori Brotto, Canadian Psychologist and author

References

High schools in Surrey, British Columbia
Educational institutions in Canada with year of establishment missing